Majoka  or Majokah (Urdu:مجوکہ) are a tribe originating from South Asia. They are thought to have originated to what is now the state of Rajasthan in India, with some later moving to the Sindh and Punjab provinces of Pakistan.

Among Hindus, Majoka is a surname used by Od Rajputs that have migrated from the Multan region of Punjab, Pakistan to India.

See also 
Haveli Majoka

References

History of Sindh
Sindhi tribes
Punjabi tribes